Bulbothrix thomasiana is a species of foliose lichen in the family Parmeliaceae. It is a corticolous species that grows on tree trunks in the northern and central parts of South America. The lichen was formally described as a new species in 2011 by lichenologists Michel Benatti and Marcelo Marcelli. The specific epithet honours American lichenologist Thomas Hawkes Nash III.

References

Parmeliaceae
Lichen species
Lichens described in 2011
Lichens of South America